The 1973 Swedish speedway season was the 1973 season of motorcycle speedway in Sweden.

Individual

Individual Championship
The 1973 Swedish Individual Speedway Championship final was held on 21 September in Gothenburg. Tommy Johansson won the Swedish Championship.

Junior Championship
 
Winner - Sven Andersson

Team

Team Championship
Smederna won division 1 and were declared the winners of the Swedish Speedway Team Championship for the first time. The Smederna team included Tommy Jansson, Göte Nordin and Bengt Jansson.

Indianerna and Kaparna won the second division east and west respectively, while Piraterna won the third division.

See also 
 Speedway in Sweden

References

Speedway leagues
Professional sports leagues in Sweden
Swedish
Seasons in Swedish speedway